Miklós Srp (born 6 March 1993) is a Hungarian race walker. He competed in the 50 km event at the 2016 Summer Olympics but was disqualified during the race.

References

External links 

 
 
 
 
 

1993 births
Living people
Hungarian male racewalkers
Olympic athletes of Hungary
Athletes (track and field) at the 2016 Summer Olympics